Davdan may refer to:
 Davdan-e Bala
 Davdan-e Pain